Chettithody Shamshuddin (born 22 March 1970) is an Indian cricket umpire. He is a member of the Emirates International Panel of ICC Umpires in the on-field category and officiates in One Day Internationals (ODIs) and Twenty20 Internationals (T20Is).

Umpiring career
Shamsuddin was appointed as the Indian representative to the International Panel of ICC Umpires in the third umpire category in 2013.

See also
 List of One Day International cricket umpires
 List of Twenty20 International cricket umpires

References

1970 births
Living people
Indian cricket umpires
Indian One Day International cricket umpires
Indian Twenty20 International cricket umpires
Cricketers from Hyderabad, India